The 23rd Asian TV Cup will begin on 10 June 2011 and will finish on June 10th 2011  The match-ups were drawn on 7 June. Kong Jie defended the title for a third straight time, second behind Takemiya Masaki's record of four straight.

Participants
 China: Kong Jie (defending champion), Zhong Wenjing (winner of the 22nd CCTV Cup), Wang Lei (CCTV Cup runner-up)
 Japan: Yamada Kimio (58th NHK Cup winner), Yoda Norimoto (NHK Cup runner-up)
 Korea: Park Junghwan (29th KBS Cup winner), Paek Hongsuk (KBS Cup runner-up)

Tournament

References

2011 in go
Go competitions in Asia